La piste du sud is a 1938 French adventure film directed by Pierre Billon.

Cast 
 Ketti Gallian - Hélène Marchand
 Albert Préjean - Le lieutenant Naud
 Pierre Renoir - Stolberg
 Jean-Louis Barrault - Olcott
 René Lefèvre - L'instituteur Saillant
 Jacques Baumer - Gomez
 Arthur Devère - Gingembre
 André Fouché - Le sous-lieutenant Beaumont
 Jean Brochard - Adjudant Soulier 
 Geymond Vital - Braun 
 Jean Témerson - Chailloux

References

External links 

1938 adventure films
1938 films
French adventure films
Films set in Algeria
Films set in deserts
Films set in the French colonial empire
Films based on Belgian novels
French black-and-white films
1930s French films